The Shipping Commissioners Act of 1872 was a United States law dealing with American mariners serving in the United States Merchant Marine.

Among other things, the act:
was passed to combat crimps.
required that a sailor had to sign on to a ship in the presence of a federal shipping commissioner.
required that a seaman be paid off in person.

The presence of a shipping commissioner was intended to ensure the sailor wasn't "forcibly or unknowingly signed on by a crimp."

The legislation was modeled on England’s Merchant Shipping Act of 1854.

See also

Shanghaiing
Maritime history of the United States
Slave Trade Acts

Notes

References

1872 in American law
United States federal admiralty and maritime legislation